The Ministry of Telecommunications is a ministry responsible for overseeing and managing telecommunications in Somalia. The current Minister of Telecommunications is Abdi Anshur.

See also
 Agriculture in Somalia

References

Government ministries of Somalia